Charles Isaac "Ike" Van Zandt (February 1876 – September 14, 1908) was an American Major League Baseball player born in Brooklyn, New York, who played three seasons in the majors from 1901 to 1905.  After his major league career, he was involved in a scandal involving possibly throwing a game for money, and committed suicide.

Career 
Van Zandt began his major league career with the New York Giants of the National League in 1901.  He played in three games that season, pitching in two, and played left field in the other.  He pitched a total of 12⅔ innings and had an earned run average of 7.11.  He had one hit in six at bats, and scored one run.

Van Zandt's next appearance in the majors didn't occur until 1904, when he played in three games for the Chicago Cubs.  He played the three games in the outfield, and did not gather a hit in 11 at-bats.  Later, during the 1904 season, he returned to Nashua to play for their minor league baseball team in the New England League, from where the St. Louis Browns, of the American League, drafted him on September 1, 1904, in the Rule 5 draft.

His one season in St. Louis was where he had most of his major league experience, playing in 94 games, batted .233 in 322 at-bats, totaling 15 doubles, one triple, one home run, and scored 31 runs.  This was his last major league season.  He later played for minor league teams in St. Paul, Minnesota, Binghamton, New York, and Albany, New York.

Death 
Van Zandt had finished the 1908 season, playing for the Albany baseball team, when he returned to his hometown of Nashua. On September 14, he committed suicide, by shooting himself through the heart with a revolver.  One possible reason for his decision was a possible involvement in a game fixing scandal that was about to be printed by a newspaper.  However, according to SABR, he wrote  two-page note to his wife explaining that he had developed terrible stomach issues and that he didn't want to be a burden to her before shooting himself. 
He is interred at Woodlawn Cemetery.

References

External links 

1876 births
1908 suicides
Major League Baseball outfielders
St. Louis Browns players
New York Giants (NL) players
Chicago Cubs players
Baseball players from New Hampshire
Sportspeople from Brooklyn
Baseball players from New York City
Sportspeople from Nashua, New Hampshire
Suicides by firearm in New Hampshire
New London Whalers players
Worcester Hustlers players
St. Paul Saints (AA) players
Binghamton Bingoes players
Butte Miners players
Vancouver Canucks (baseball) players
Albany Senators players
Scranton Miners players